The Middelgrunden wind farm stands on the shoal Middelgrunden, between shipping lanes in the Øresund, 3.5 km outside Copenhagen, Denmark. When it was built in 2000, it was the world's largest offshore farm, with 20 turbines (2 MW Bonus each) and a capacity of 40 MW. The farm delivers about 4% of the power for Copenhagen.

In 1996, the project was initiated by the Copenhagen Environment and Energy Office (CEEO) after Middelgrunden had been listed as a potential site in the Danish Action Plan for Offshore Wind. Together with the CEEO a group of local people formed the Middelgrunden Wind Turbine Cooperative and established a cooperation with Copenhagen Energy, the local electric utility. The proposed location was initially opposed by the Danish Society for Nature Conservation, but this decision was later changed.

Concrete gravity base foundations were chosen as the cheapest option.

This project is an example for community wind energy. It is 50% owned by the 10,000 investors in the Middelgrunden Wind Turbine Cooperative, and 50% by the municipal utility company. It is clearly visible from the capital of Denmark.

See also

 List of offshore wind farms in Denmark
 List of offshore wind farms in the Baltic Sea

References

External links

 Middelgrunden Wind Turbine Cooperative (English page)
 Middelgrunden at 4C
 LORC Knowledge - Datasheet for Middelgrunden Offshore Wind Farm
 Middelgrunden at PowerTechnology
 TV documentary, in Danish

Offshore wind farms in the Baltic Sea
Wind farms in Denmark
Energy infrastructure completed in 2000
2000 establishments in Denmark